Jean de Marbot may refer to:

 Jean-Antoine Marbot (1754–1800), French divisional general and politician
 Marcellin Marbot (Jean-Baptiste Antoine Marcelin Marbot, 1782–1854), French lieutenant-général (divisional general)

See also